Pinus taeda, commonly known as loblolly pine, is one of several subtropical pines native to the Southeastern United States, from East Texas to Florida, and north to southern New Jersey. The wood industry classifies the species as a southern yellow pine. U.S. Forest Service surveys found that loblolly pine is the second-most common species of tree in the United States, after red maple. For its timber, the pine species is regarded as the most commercially important tree in the Southeastern U.S. The common name loblolly is given because the pine species is found mostly in lowlands and swampy areas. 

Loblolly pine is the first among over 100 species of Pinus to have its complete genome sequenced. As of March 2014, it was the organism having the largest sequenced genome size. Its genome, with 22 billion base pairs, is seven times larger than that of humans. As of 2018, assembly of the axolotl genome (32Gb) displaced loblolly pine as the largest assembled genome. The loblolly pine was selected as the official state tree of Arkansas in 1939.

Description
The needles usually last up to two years before they fall, which gives the species its evergreen character.

Although some needles fall throughout the year due to severe weather, insect damage, and drought, most needles fall during the autumn and winter of their second year.

Etymology & Taxonomy
The word "loblolly" is a combination of "lob", referring to thick, heavy bubbling of cooking porridge, and "lolly", an old British dialect word for broth, soup, or any other food boiled in a pot. In the southern United States, the word is used to mean "a mudhole; a mire," a sense derived from an allusion to the consistency of porridge. Hence, the pine is named as it is generally found in lowlands and swampy areas. Loblolly pines grow well in acidic clay soil, which is common throughout the South, thus are often found in large stands in rural places.

Other old names, now rarely used, include oldfield pine due to its status as an early colonizer of abandoned fields; bull pine due to its size (several other yellow pines are also often so named, especially large isolated specimens); rosemary pine due to loblolly's distinctive fragrance compared to the other southern pines; and North Carolina pine.

For the scientific name, Pinus is the Latin name for the pines and taeda refers to the resinous wood.

Ecology
With the advent of wildfire suppression, loblolly pine has become prevalent in some parts of the Deep South that were once dominated by longleaf pine and, especially in northern Florida, slash pine.

Its rate of growth is rapid, even among the generally fast-growing southern pines. The yellowish, resinous wood is prized for lumber, but is also used for wood pulp. This tree is commercially grown in extensive plantations.

Loblolly pine is the pine of the Lost Pines Forest around Bastrop, Texas, and in McKinney Roughs along the Texas Colorado River. These are isolated populations on areas of acidic sandy soil, surrounded by alkaline clays that are poor for pine growth.

A study using loblolly pines showed that higher atmospheric carbon dioxide levels may help the trees to endure ice storms better.

Notable trees
The famous "Eisenhower Tree" on the 17th hole of Augusta National Golf Club was a loblolly pine. U.S. President Dwight D. Eisenhower, an Augusta National member, hit the tree so many times that at a 1956 club meeting, he proposed that it be cut down. Not wanting to offend the President, the club's chairman, Clifford Roberts, immediately adjourned the meeting rather than reject the request outright. In February 2014, an ice storm severely damaged the Eisenhower Tree. The opinion of arborists was that the tree could not be saved and should be removed, which it subsequently was.

Loblolly pine seeds were carried aboard the Apollo 14 flight. On its return, the seeds were planted in several locations in the US, including the grounds of the White House. , a number of these moon trees remain alive.

Genome
Pines are the most common conifers and the genus Pinus consists of more than 100 species. Sequencing of their genomes remained a huge challenge because of the high complexity and size. Loblolly pine became the first species with its complete genome sequenced. This was the largest genome assembled until 2018, when the axolotl genome (32Gb) was assembled.

The loblolly pine genome is made up of 22.18 billion base pairs, which is more than seven times that of humans. Conifer genomes are known to be full of repetitive DNA, which make up 82% of the genome in loblolly pine (compared to only 50% in humans). The number of genes is estimated at about 50,172, of which 15,653 are already confirmed. Most of the genes are duplicates. Some genes have the longest introns observed among fully sequenced plant genomes.

Inbreeding depression
Gymnosperms are predominantly outcrossing, but lack genetic self-incompatibility. Loblolly pine, like most gymnosperms, exhibits high levels of inbreeding depression, especially in the embryonic stage. The loblolly pine harbors an average load of at least eight lethal equivalents. A lethal equivalent is the number of deleterious genes per haploid genome whose cumulative effect is the equivalent of one lethal gene. The presence of at least eight lethal equivalents implies substantial inbreeding depression upon self-fertilization.

See also
 Sonderegger pine, a hybrid between loblolly and longleaf species

References

External links
 
 

taeda
Trees of humid continental climate
Least concern plants
Symbols of Arkansas
Plants described in 1753
Taxa named by Carl Linnaeus
Trees of North America